The 2017–18 San Diego State men's basketball team represented San Diego State University during the 2017–18 NCAA Division I men's basketball season. The Aztecs, led by first-year head coach Brian Dutcher, played their home games at Viejas Arena as members in the Mountain West Conference. They finished the season 22–11, 11–7 in Mountain West play to finish in a tie for fourth place. They defeated Fresno State, Nevada, and New Mexico to become champions of the Mountain West tournament. As a result, they received the Mountain West's automatic bid to the NCAA tournament. As the No. 11 seed in the West region, they lost to Houston in the first round.

Previous season
The Aztecs finished the season 19–14, 9–9 in Mountain West play to finish in a tie for fifth place. They defeated UNLV and Boise State to advance to the semifinals of the Mountain West tournament where they lost to Colorado State. They Aztecs did not participate in a postseason tournament for the first time since the 2004–05 season.

On April 11, 2017, head coach Steve Fisher announced his retirement after 18 seasons at San Diego State and 27 seasons overall as NCAA head coach, handing over the head coaching job to his longtime assistant Brian Dutcher.

Offseason

Departures

Incoming transfers

2017 recruiting class

2018 Recruiting class

Preseason
In a vote by conference media at the Mountain West media day, the Aztecs were picked to finish in second place in the Mountain West. Senior guard Trey Kell was named to the preseason All-Mountain West team.

Roster

Schedule and results

|-
!colspan=9 style=| Exhibition

|-
!colspan=9 style=| Non-conference regular season

|-
!colspan=9 style=| Mountain West regular season

|-
!colspan=9 style=| Mountain West tournament

|-
!colspan=9 style=| NCAA tournament

References

San Diego State Aztecs men's basketball seasons
San Diego State
San Diego State
San Diego State
San Diego State